"Elegí" is a song recorded by Puerto Rican singer Rauw Alejandro, American singer Dalex and Puerto Rican singer Lenny Tavárez, featuring Panamanian producer Dímelo Flow. It was written by Dalex, Isac Ortiz, Alejandro, Borris, Tavárez, Slow Mike, Ramses Iván Herrera Soto, Joshua Javier Méndez, and Dímelo Flow, while the production was handled by Dímelo Flow. The song was released for digital download and streaming as a single by Sony Music Latin on March 26, 2020. A Spanish language reggaeton song, with elements of R&B and electronic music, it is about two people who have intense sexual chemistry and reconnect after having the "best night ever".

"Elegí" received positive reviews from music critics, who complimented its musical arrangements and the singer's vocal mix. It was commercially successful, reaching the top 10 in seven countries, such as Argentina, Colombia, and Mexico. The song has received several certifications, including Latin platinum in the United States. An accompanying music video, released simultaneously with the song, was filmed in Miami Beach and directed by Gustavo Camacho.

A remix of "Elegí" featuring Puerto Rican singer Farruko, Puerto Rican rapper Anuel AA, Panamanian singer Sech, and American singer Justin Quiles, was released on August 27, 2020, as the second single from Alejandro's debut studio album Afrodisíaco (2020). The remix received positive reviews from music critics, who highlighted its added "spice" and "sensuality". An accompanying music video, directed by Camacho, was released simultaneously with the remix. It depicts each of the artists performing on an individual stage, where they share intimacy with their respective partners.

Background and release
On March 13, 2020, Rauw Alejandro teased a collaboration on Twitter: "Rauw ft. ??????? 🤔". Dalex replied to his tweet with a part of the song's lyrics, "Yo no te elegí mi cama fue quien brego ahy". On March 25, Alejandro shared a video of himself listening to a snippet of the track and announced that it would be released that week. "Elegí" by Alejandro, Dalex, and Lenny Tavárez featuring Dímelo Flow was released for digital download and streaming by Sony Music Latin on March 26, 2020.

Music and lyrics

Musically, "Elegí" is a Spanish language reggaeton song, with elements of R&B and electronic music. The song was written by Dalex, Isac Ortiz, Alejandro, Borris, Tavárez, Slow Mike, Ramses Iván Herrera Soto, Joshua Javier Méndez, and Dímelo Flow. Its production was handled by Dímelo Flow, and the track runs for a total of 3 minutes and 17 seconds. Lyrically, "Elegí" which translates to "I Chose" in English, is about two people who have intense sexual chemistry and reconnect after having the "best night ever".

Critical reception
Man Hoh Tang Serradell from Revista Young España gave "Elegí" a positive review, noting its fusion of reggaeton and electronic rhythms, and stated that it "captures our attention with its seductive musical arrangements". He continued complimenting the singers as "talented" and described their vocal mix as "delightful". In 2022, Happy FM staff listed the track among Tavárez's five collaborations with which the artist has made history, saying that it "stands out for being very melodic" and "his verses add a lot of energy and sensuality" to the song.

Commercial performance
"Elegí" debuted and peaked at number 12 on the US Billboard Latin Digital Song Sales chart on September 12, 2020, becoming Alejandro's sixth entry on the chart, Dalex's third, Tavárez's fourth, and Dímelo Flow's second. In May 2020, the song was certified Latin platinum by the Recording Industry Association of America (RIAA), for track-equivalent sales of over 60,000 units in the United States.

In Spain's official weekly chart, the song debuted at number 34 on April 5, 2020. It subsequently peaked at number 26 on May 31, 2020, and spent 22 consecutive weeks on the chart. It was later certified platinum by the Productores de Música de España (PROMUSICAE), for track-equivalent sales of over 40,000 units in the country. In Latin America, "Elegí" reached the top 10 in Argentina, Colombia, Dominican Republic, Mexico, Paraguay, Peru, and Uruguay. In Mexico, the song was certified diamond + 2× platinum by the Asociación Mexicana de Productores de Fonogramas y Videogramas (AMPROFON), for track-equivalent sales of over 420,000 units.

Promotion

Music video

An accompanying music video was released simultaneously with the song. The visual was produced by Dímelo Flow and directed by Venezuelan director Gustavo Camacho, who had also directed the videos for Alejandro's previous singles "Fantasías" and "Fantasías (Remix)". The video was filmed in Miami Beach and depicts Art Deco architecture, as well as the friendship between the four artists. It has received over 300 million views on YouTube.

Live performances
The song was included on the set list for Alejandro's the Rauw Alejandro World Tour.

Remix

On August 26, 2020, Alejandro teased a remix of "Elegí" on Twitter, tweeting "ELEGI REMIX 🤯". The following day, he released the remix version featuring Puerto Rican singer Farruko, Puerto Rican rapper Anuel AA, Panamanian singer Sech, and American singer Justin Quiles, as the second single from his debut studio album Afrodisíaco (2020). Anuel AA, Andy Bauza, Farruko, Cristian Andrés Salazar, Frank Miami, Quiles, and Sech joined the original version's lyricists to write the remix version. Anuel AA verse references his 2018 song "Amanece". The version runs for a total of 5 minutes and 23 seconds.

Critical reception
Upon release, "Elegí (Remix)" was met with positive reviews from music critics. In her review for Billboard, Jessica Roiz stated that Anuel AA, Farruko, Sech, and Quiles, add "more spice and sensuality" to the song. An author of El Comercio described the production as "epic", while El Vocero staff named the artists "some of the most popular performers of the reggaeton genre".

Commercial performance
"Elegí (Remix)" failed to match the commercial success of its original version. The remix debuted and peaked at number 61 on Spain's official weekly chart on the chart issue dated September 6, 2020. In Paraguay, it reached number 91 on SGP's monthly chart in November 2020.

Music video

An accompanying music video was released simultaneously with the song. The visual was produced by Mastermind Entertainment and directed by Gustavo Camacho. It depicts each of the artists performing on an individual stage, where they share intimacy with their respective partners. An author of El Comercio labeled it "an artistic representation of the message of sensuality and romanticism within the song".

Track listings

Credits and personnel
Credits adapted from Tidal.
 Rauw Alejandro associated performer, composer, lyricist
 Dalex associated performer, composer, lyricist
 Lenny Tavárez associated performer, composer, lyricist
 Dímelo Flow associated performer, composer, lyricist, producer, featured artist, mixing engineer
 Isac Ortiz composer, lyricist
 Eric Pérez Rovira "Eric Duars" composer, lyricist, executive producer
 Slow Mike composer, lyricist
 Ramses Iván Herrera Soto composer, lyricist
 Joshua Javier Méndez composer, lyricist
 Mike Fuller mastering engineer
 José M. Collazo recording engineer
 Farruko associated performer, composer, lyricist, featured artist for the remix version
 Anuel AA associated performer, composer, lyricist, featured artist for the remix version
 Sech associated performer, composer, lyricist, featured artist for the remix version
 Justin Quiles associated performer, composer, lyricist, featured artist for the remix version
 Andy Bauza composer, lyricist for the remix version
 Cristian Andrés Salazar composer, lyricist for the remix version
 Frank Miami composer, lyricist for the remix version

Charts

Weekly charts

Monthly charts

Year-end charts

Certifications

Release history

See also
 List of Billboard Argentina Hot 100 top-ten singles in 2020

Footnotes

References

2020 songs
2020 singles
Anuel AA songs
Farruko songs
Justin Quiles songs
Rauw Alejandro songs
Songs written by Rauw Alejandro
Sony Music Latin singles
Spanish-language songs